Davidson Peak is the tallest summit and the southernmost in the East Mormon Mountains, Nevada, United States.

Climate
Davidson Peak is set in the Great Basin Desert which has hot summers and cold winters. The desert is an example of a cold desert climate as the desert's elevation makes temperatures cooler than lower elevation deserts. Due to the high elevation and aridity, temperatures drop sharply after sunset. Summer nights are comfortably cool. Winter highs are generally above freezing, and winter nights are bitterly cold, with temperatures often dropping well below freezing.

See also
 
 Great Basin

References

External links
 Weather forecast: Davidson Peak

Mountains of Lincoln County, Nevada
Mountains of Nevada
North American 1000 m summits
Mountains of the Great Basin